MDVIP is an American company, headquartered in Boca Raton, Florida, that operates a network of physicians.  The company's physicians practice preventive medicine and personalized primary-care medicine.

The national network consists of 1,100 physicians serving over 380,000 patients in 45 states and the District of Columbia. Each physician cares for up to 600 patients as opposed to the average 2,500-3,500 patients in a traditional primary-care practice. MDVIP patients receive a comprehensive physical examination and follow-up wellness plan as well as electronic medical records and a personalized patient portal with focus on diet, exercise, doctor communication and more. The company states that additional patient benefits include acute-care visits, same or next-day availability, on-time appointments, 24/7 physician availability, and enhanced coordination of specialty care.

History
Founded in Boca Raton in 2000. In June 2014, growth-equity investor Summit Partners acquired the company from Procter & Gamble. In November 2017, Leonard Green & Partners acquired majority ownership. In October 2021, Goldman Sachs Asset Management's Private Equity group and Charlesbank Capital Partners completed the acquisition of MDVIP from Leonard Green & Partners and Summit Partners.

Business model
To supplement insurance reimbursements, MDVIP physicians charge patients an annual fee between $1,800 and $2,200 per year. In addition to this annual fee, patients are responsible for applicable co-pays and co-insurance, and maintain primary-care insurance coverage including Medicare. In contrast to the direct-care model, this revenue format, often referenced as concierge medicine, runs the risk of audit or penalty as Medicare and other private-insurance carriers cover a comprehensive wellness exam currently listed as part of the MDVIP package.

MDVIP physicians are not directly employed by the company, instead they pay a royalty or franchise fee of 1/3rd of the membership fee per patient per year for services such as patient conversion, marketing, branding and other support.

See also

 List of Florida companies

References

Further reading
 "Concierge Medicine: Greater Access for a Fee". PBS NewsHour. PBS television, July 9, 2012.

External links
 , the company's official website

2000 establishments in Florida
Companies based in Boca Raton, Florida
Companies established in 2000
Former Procter & Gamble brands
Health maintenance organizations
Privately held companies based in Florida
Medical and health organizations based in Florida